Pantachogon is a genus of hydrozoans of the family Rhopalonematidae. The genus includes three species.

References

World Register of Marine Species.

Rhopalonematidae
Hydrozoan genera